Tesoro High School is a public high school in southern Orange County area of Las Flores, California, United States. Established in the fall of 2001, Tesoro is 1 of 6 regular high schools in the Capistrano Unified School District. As of the 2014–2015 year, Tesoro serves nearly 2500 students in grades 9–12. Students attending Tesoro are within the cities of Rancho Santa Margarita, Las Flores, Ladera Ranch, Coto de Caza and Mission Viejo.

Achievements
Tesoro is a California Distinguished School.

In 2013, Newsweek's "America's Top Public High Schools" feature ranked Tesoro as number 337 out of the 1,300 top high schools nationwide. This makes it, as of 2013, the  highest ranked in the school district. In 2008, Tesoro was the second highest in the district, while in 2007 it was ranked third. In 2015, Tesoro Performing Arts Department (orchestra, band, and choir) was one of the top competitors vying for a Grammy.  Now, they are known to be a Grammy Signature School.

The Tesoro High School Chamber Orchestra performed for the State Music Educator's Conference in Sacramento and, along with the Wind Ensemble, performed in Carnegie Hall in April 2007.

Tesoro's choral music department under the leadership of Keith Hancock has also been recognized as one of top choral programs in Southern California, being selected as a 2015 Grammy Signature School for Excellence (one of five in the nation)  and having received an invitation to perform at the 2012 and 2016 American Choral Directors Association Western Division Conferences. In 2013, Tesoro's Madrigals performed the world premiere of Un Tesoro Perfecto, by composer Luke Mayernik, at Carnegie Hall in New York.  The Tesoro Madrigals won the Golden State South Choral Competition in 2008 and A Cappella won in 2010.  In 2005, 2010, and 2011, Tesoro's Barbershop Quartet placed first in the Barbershop Harmony Society Far Western District High School Quartet Championship.  The choir has performed extensively throughout Southern California, as well as Spain, Germany, Austria, Switzerland, England, Ireland, and Mexico.  The choir has never received less than a superior rating at an adjudicated festival. In 2017, out of more than 3,300 nominations nationwide, choir director Keith Hancock became the recipient of the 2017 Music Educator Award and was named Grammy Educator of the Year, presented by The Recording Academy and the GRAMMY Foundation.

Tesoro High School's theatre arts department is under the leadership of Cheryl Des Palmes. In 2004 and 2005, Tesoro High School's theatre arts department won many CAPPIES awards. In 2013, Legally Blonde: The Musical won for Best Musical, Best Orchestra, Best Featured Actor in a Musical, and Best Comedic Actress in a Musical, among some 30 nominations. In 2014, their production of Seussical won for Best Musical, Best Orchestra, and again, Best Comedic Actress in a Musical. Additionally, they won two CAPPIES for Once on This Island in 2015  and three for Romeo & Juliet in 2016. The department participates annually in Theatre Festivals including: South Orange County Roleabout, Fullerton Junior College High School Theatre Festival, California Educational Theatre Association's festival, and the Long Beach State High School Theatre Festival.

Athletics

The Tesoro High School Varsity football team beat Western High School in 2004 to capture their first division title. In 2005, the Titans became Back-To-Back Division IX CIF Champions after beating Northwood High School for the second time that season.

Tesoro was moved into the more competitive South Coast League for sports in the 2006 school year. Although the 2004 and 2005 football teams had beaten several teams from upper division schools, including Dana Hills, Foothill, Kennedy, and Laguna Hills,

and the '04 and '05 teams were ranked among the top 10 high school football teams in Orange County,
the team placed last in the league in 2006, after losing key players from the CIF Championship teams.

However, in its second season in Division I the Titan football team captured the South Coast League Championship, going undefeated in league play in 2007, and defeating both Mission Viejo and San Clemente. Today, their football head coach is Matt Poston.

2007 - In Baseball, Tesoro finished 2nd after Capo Valley in the South Coast League with a 17-10 record and 10-5 in league.  Tesoro lost in the first round of CIF playoffs to Mater Dei.

2013-2017 In Track and Field,- Tesoro boys have qualified for the CIF Finals.

In 2004, The Tesoro Women's soccer team captured their first CIF victory with a 1-0 win over Buena High School. Again In 2006, the Tesoro High School Girls' Varsity Soccer team tied with San Marcos High School to split the Division II Championship.

Tesoro High School Aquatics also has a trophy-winning Swim Team and Men's and Women's Water Polo as part of its water sports program. Girls' water polo made it to the 2007 SS-CIF playoffs in division II. This was the first year Tesoro Girls' water polo team has made it to CIF.

The Girls' Swim Team, led by Coach Todd Conrad, are undefeated in 7 years (2014-2021) of South Coast League action resulting in 6 straight League titles.  Over that period the "Lady Titans's" CIF rankings have improved each year from 8th in 2014, 3rd in 2015, 3rd in 2016, 2nd Place in 2017, and 2nd Place once again in 2018 making Tesoro the highest ranked public high school in Southern California. In 2016, the Lady Titans team are ranked number one in Orange County, beating their number one opponent, Santa Margarita Catholic High School at the Capo Relays.

In 2021 the Boy's Swim Team, under the coaching of Mike Gibson, secured its first South Coast League title, defeating Aliso Niguel High School and bringing home its second league title since winning Sea View League in 2012.

2011- 2017 The men's cross country team have qualified for CIF-SS Finals 7 years in a row. In 2013 and 2014 Tesoro men have qualified for CIF State Championships.

The 2008-2009 school year brought many returns for sports teams at Tesoro.  Varsity football became the South Coast League champions, for the second year in the row.  To get there, they had to beat their rivals from Mission Viejo High School for the second year in a row.  They went on to make it to the CIF Southern Section championship game at the Angel Stadium of Anaheim, and lost to Long Beach Polytechnic High School.

The 2009 season also brought in many freshman for the Girls' Varsity Cross Country Team. The freshman team won the Laguna Hills Invitational and placed second to Great Oak High School. The varsity team also placed first at Woodbridge and Mt. Sac. For the first time in the school's history, the team advanced on to CIF prelims with an at large spot and qualified for CIF finals.

The 2009 varsity basketball team became the South Coast League champions, and also went to the CIF Southern Section championship game at the Honda Center where they beat Ventura High School.  They went on to the second round of the state championship where they lost to Martin Luther King High School.

Academics
According to the California Department of Education Policy and Evaluation Division, Tesoro High School's 2008 API score was 836, a 21-point growth from 2007 which was 815. There were 2071 students included in this API score.

Facilities
Tesoro is the second newest high school in CUSD. Tesoro opened in 2001 serving Las Flores, Rancho Santa Margarita, Ladera Ranch, Coto de Caza, and Dove Canyon.

The modern school is built in a canyon at the end of the 241 toll road in between Las Flores and Coto de Caza south of Oso Parkway.

Tesoro has two baseball fields, aquatics facilities, one softball field, one soccer/football practice field (in one of the baseball field's outfields), eight tennis courts, four volleyball courts, two basketball courts, and a football and track stadium.  In 2006, the stadium was upgraded with artificial turf and track to match the other district high schools. Over the summers of 2014 and 2015, a group of Tesoro students painted most of the school hallways, themed by subject and adding a unique, vibrant mood to the walls.

A building was built in the summer of 2017 to replace the portable classrooms that occupied the basketball courts and volleyball courts.

Extracurricular activities
In 2009, Tesoro High School's mock trial team won the Constitutional Rights Foundation's Orange County Mock Trial Competition for the first time in school history.  The team defeated Woodbridge High School, and proceeded to the state finals competition in San Jose, CA. In 2005 and 2011, they were county finalists, losing to Woodbridge in the finals on both occasions.  In 2012, Tesoro's mock trial team once again made it to county finals, but lost to Saddleback Christian Academy.

As of 2014, Tesoro has over 75 clubs, in addition to chapters of the National Honor Society, California Scholarship Federation, and Impact Freshman Transition Program. All extracurricular activities, including dances and graduation, are under the direction of the Associated Student Body.

Notable alumni
 Evan Alberto, Magician and Social Media Personality, Class of 2017
 Cole Custer, NASCAR driver, Class of 2016
 Christian Yount, NFL long snapper, Class of 2006
 Jenn Proske, Actress, Class of 2005
 Erik Hamren (baseball), MLB Pitcher, Class of 2005
 Nicole "Nikki" Catsouras, known for accident photos of her untimely death, Class of 2006

In the media
In 2005, two star football players, Scott McKnight and Sam Smith, were expelled for writing explicit and graphic death threats that involved sexual actions. The students wrote the journals for a class assignment that the teacher, to whom they were referring, collected and then promptly notified school officials.

In 2008, seniors Omar Khan and Tanvir Singh were arrested and indicted on several felony and misdemeanor charges, including burglary, identity theft, computer abuse, and records tampering in an elaborate cheating scandal. Khan pled guilty to five felonies and Singh to one felony and one misdemeanor, and were sentenced to jail time, community service, and ordered to pay damages.

References

External links

Educational institutions established in 2001
High schools in Orange County, California
Public high schools in California
2001 establishments in California